Carine Mbuh Ndoum Yoh (born 10 April 1993) is a Cameroonian football forward last played in the Turkish Women's First Football League for Ataşehir Belediyespor and the Cameroonian national team.

Playing career

Club
In 2010, Yoh played for her hometown club Gentile Ladies Bamenda. The next season, she joined Ecole Franck Rohliceck de Douala.

Yoh was transferred in the 2013–14 season by the Nigerian club Confluence Queens FC from Panthère Security de Garoua in Cameroon to play in the Nigeria Women Premier League.

In January 2016, she left her Lokoja-based club to move to Turkey for Ataşehir Belediyespor, which play in the Turkish Women's First Football League.

International
In 2010, 2012 and again in 2014, she was admitted to the Cameroon women's national football team.

Career statistics
.

References

1993 births
Living people
People from Bamenda
Cameroonian women's footballers
Women's association football midfielders
Cameroon women's international footballers
Ataşehir Belediyespor players
Cameroonian expatriate women's footballers
Cameroonian expatriate sportspeople in Nigeria
Expatriate footballers in Nigeria Women Premier League
Cameroonian expatriate sportspeople in Turkey
Expatriate women's footballers in Turkey